Sophia Julia Woolf (1831–20 November 1893) was an English composer known for songs and opera.

Woolf's father was John Woolf, a furrier.  She had two sisters and was married to John Isaacson. Woolf's daughter, Maud, was the mother of the musician Vivian Ellis

Life and works
Woolf composed piano pieces and songs for theatrical productions.
A review of her opera Carina in the New York Times described it as:
"Carina," the new comic opera produced at the Opera Comique to-night, gives every indication of achieving a pronounced success: The story is light and good, the comedy opportunities are numerous, and the music is artistically firm and popularly pleasing.

Works
Carina — Comic opera, music by Julia Woolf, words by EL Blanchard and Cunningham Bridgman, first produced at the Opera Comique, London, Sept. 27, 1888.

References

1831 births
1903 deaths
Women classical composers
English classical composers
English opera composers
19th-century classical composers
19th-century English musicians
Women opera composers
19th-century British composers
19th-century women composers